Boblo Island Amusement Park is an abandoned amusement park which operated from 1898 until its closure on September 30, 1993. Its amusement rides were sold in 1994.

The park was located on Bois Blanc Island, Ontario, just above the mouth of the Detroit River. The people of Detroit, Michigan, characterized it as the city's Coney Island.

History

Bob-Lo Excursion Co. v. Michigan
The State of Michigan brought a racial discrimination case against the operators of the ferry service. After Michigan found Bob-Lo guilty and fined the company, Bob-Lo filed a lawsuit against the state, Bob-Lo Excursion Co. v. Michigan, 333 U.S. 28 (1948). The case reached the U.S. Supreme Court and resulted in a notable 1948 decision construing the scope of the commerce clause. In June 1945, Sarah Elizabeth Ray and 12 other female workers involved in the war effort (and referred to as "girls" during the legal proceedings) took part in a sponsored trip to Boblo Island. Ray was removed from the boat because she was not white, enforced according to a Bob-Lo company policy "excluding so-called 'zoot-suiters', the rowdyish, the rough, and the boisterous, and it also adopted the policy of excluding colored." The Michigan Supreme Court fined the company $25 for the discrimination they presented towards Ray. The company had claimed it could exclude her because it was a private concern operating in another country and that neither Michigan nor any other state had authority to regulate commerce with Canada (a foreign country); the U.S. Supreme Court affirmed the Michigan Supreme Court, which had upheld the jurisdiction of the state's anti-discrimination provisions and found against the company.

Final years
Though it was not looking for a buyer, the Michigan AAA sold Boblo Island in 1988 to the International Broadcasting Corporation, a Minneapolis-based concern that owned the Harlem Globetrotters and Ice Capades.

IBC declared bankruptcy in 1991. The boats were sold off as a result of a decision to shutter operations at the Detroit dock. In February 1992, the park was put up for sale for US$9 million, half of its 1988 purchase price, though it committed to opening it for that summer. Though one expert felt that Boblo was too big to fail outright and could be turned around, By June, however, no firm offers had been made for the park. The loss of the Detroit ferry service dented attendance severely in the 1992 season, which along with poor weather caused the park to miss its attendance goal.

With no buyers materializing, Norton Auctioneers of Coldwater, Michigan, was retained to sell the property at auction on February 10, 1993. Roger Fachini, a 40-year-old engineer for General Dynamics and owner of a waterpark in Utica, Michigan, placed the winning $3.8 million bid and proposed redevelopment after two years, but Boblo's creditors turned it down; after the deposit cheque bounced, they took $600,000 less in the bid from Enchanted Parks of Seattle, owners of the Wild Waves Theme Park near that city.

The 1993 season proved bumpy and was marred by miscues including disputes with island residents and the Canadian Coast Guard, compounded by the leader of Enchanted Parks, Michael Moodenbaugh, being seriously injured and breaking his spine in a car accident in Toledo, Ohio, in September. Moodenbaugh had hired Liberal MPP Remo Mancini to help market the park. Larry Benaroya, his associate, and his Northern Capital took control of the property; Mancini was fired, and the ownership group put it back on the market in January 1994. Moodenbaugh later sued Benaroya and others for attempting to sell the park while he lay in a "virtual coma".

In March 1994, the rides were dismantled and sold off piecemeal to the Pacific National Exhibition and a series of U.S. theme parks, a moment that confirmed the "worst fears" of Malden Township officials; the amusement park paid 25 percent of its taxes.

Reuse of the property
In 1994, John Oram, an Iraqi immigrant to the United States who owned car stereo businesses, purchased the Boblo Island site. He vaguely proposed a casino, hotel, and other development. Oram then leased and shut down the White Sands boater's hangout adjacent to the park site, citing trespassers but infuriating boaters; as a result, the lease was dropped within weeks.

In late 1995, the site began to be marketed for residential development. Townhouses and condominiums were proposed in 1997. The island was off limits to non-residents until 2002.

American investors were scared away after the September 11 attacks, which hurt the financial outlook for the development. Not a single lot was sold between 9/11 and May 2004. $19 million in debt, John's brother Randy forced Boblo Island into court-appointed receivership in 2004. KPMG found there was no money left to continue supplying basic services. Dominic Amicone became the new owner in 2005. However, a local housing slump meant little was developed.

The tower for the Space Needle ride was demolished in 2021, with Amicone citing "health and safety concerns".

Attractions

The Falling Star, log flume, Enterprise, Sky Tower (Space Needle), Ferris wheel, a zoo, and a carousel were the signature attractions. Screamer, a double corkscrew; Nightmare, an indoor all-dark ride; and Sky Streak, a steel out-and-back design, were its three roller coasters. To move visitors around the island, the park had a small railroad. In its early years,  Henry Ford financed a dance hall that was rumored to have been designed and built by famed Detroit architect Albert Kahn, but was later determined to have been designed by John Scott. The dance hall was the second largest in the world, holding 5,000 dancers at full capacity and featured one of the world's largest orchestrions from the Welte company: a 16 foot tall, 14 foot wide, self-playing Wotan-model orchestrion with 419 pipes and percussion section.

Boblo's Scootaboats, which were very similar to well known Bumper Cars, were a popular ride. The cars operated by drawing power from an overhead electric grid unlike the Bumper Boats in use today.
Beginning in 1952, Joe Short, a man of diminutive physical stature, was employed as 'Captain Boblo', and traveled on the boats entertaining passengers of all ages. He wore a variety of colorful clothing, including a large hat with 'Captain Bob Lo' on the peak, and was typically equipped with binoculars for navigation purposes. He previously worked for Ringling Brothers Circus and captivated children with adventurous tales and knock-knock jokes until his retirement in 1974, at the age of 90. After the boats docked at night back in Detroit, Mr. Short continued entertaining at the local bars and taverns he frequented.

Bob-Lo boats
The island is a five-minute ferry ride from Amherstburg, Ontario, and 18 miles from Detroit. For more than 85 years, the Boblo Island Amusement Park was famous for being served by the Steamer Ste Claire and the Steamer Columbia excursion boats that could hold about 2,500 passengers each. The "Bob-Lo boats" boats were sold in November 1991.  Other smaller ferries served the park from Amherstburg and Gibraltar, Michigan, which were located closer to the park on the Detroit River.

The SS Ste. Claire was engulfed in an accidental fire while docked on the Detroit River on July 6, 2018. The fire could not be contained and destroyed the historic mahogany woodwork and upper decks. "Yeah, she's 110 years old, but she's well-built and she survived," said boat co-owner, Ron Kattoo. "We are at the point in restoration to where it was a steel skeleton structure ready to be rebuilt." Two years later, very little had been done.

See also

 List of defunct amusement parks
Sarah Elizabeth Ray

References

External links 
 BobloSteamers.com
 Southwestern Ontario Digital Archive: Boblo Island (Ontario)
 30 photos

Defunct amusement parks in Canada
Culture of Detroit
History of Detroit
Tourist attractions in Essex County, Ontario
History of Windsor, Ontario
Culture of Windsor, Ontario
Modern ruins
Amusement parks opened in 1898
1898 establishments in Ontario
Amusement parks closed in 1993
1993 disestablishments in Ontario